155 Reservoir Road is a historic house located in Brookline, Massachusetts. It is significant as a well-preserved Greek Revival house.

Description 
The -story wood-frame structure was built sometime between 1830 and 1844, probably by Daniel Pierce. It has a traditional side-hall plan, three bays across, with paneled pilasters, and a fully pedimented gable end. A single-story porch with fluted Doric columns wraps across the front and around both sides. The house was built at the corner of Boylston Street and Reservoir Road, and moved to its present location in 1920.

The house was listed on the National Register of Historic Places on October 17, 1985.

See also
National Register of Historic Places listings in Brookline, Massachusetts

References

Houses in Brookline, Massachusetts
National Register of Historic Places in Brookline, Massachusetts
Houses on the National Register of Historic Places in Norfolk County, Massachusetts
Greek Revival architecture in Massachusetts